Heinrich Bertram was a German-born United States Army soldier who received the U.S. military's highest decoration, the Medal of Honor. He served as a Corporal in Company B, 8th U.S. Cavalry in the Arizona Territory during the American Indian Wars. Bertram served in Company B of the 8th U.S. Cavalry, and was awarded the Medal of Honor on July 24, 1869, for "bravery in scouts and actions against Indians."

References

American people of German descent
Year of birth missing (living people)